Nedim Günar (January 2, 1932, Balıkesir - September 7, 2011, İstanbul) was a Turkish football defender who played for Turkey in the 1954 FIFA World Cup. He also played for Fenerbahçe S.K.

References

External links
 
 

1932 births
2011 deaths
Sportspeople from Balıkesir
Turkish footballers
Turkey international footballers
Association football defenders
Fenerbahçe S.K. footballers
Vefa S.K. footballers
1954 FIFA World Cup players
Turkish football managers